is the Japanese Buddhist term for self power, the ability to achieve liberation or enlightenment (in other words, to reach nirvana) through one's own efforts. Jiriki and tariki (他力 meaning "other power", "outside help") are two terms in Japanese Buddhist schools that classify how one becomes spiritually enlightened. Jiriki is commonly practiced in Zen Buddhism.  In Pure Land Buddhism, tariki often refers to the power of Amitābha Buddha.

These two terms describe the strands of practice that followers of every religion throughout the world develop. In most religions you can find popular expressions of faith which rely on the worship of external powers such as an idol of some kind that is expected to bestow favor after being given offerings of faith from a believer. Some believers of Pure Land Buddhism accept that through faith and reliance on Amitabha Buddha one will be led to enlightenment. These are examples of tariki, reliance on a power outside of oneself for salvation.

Jiriki is seeking spiritual enlightenment through one's own efforts. An example of jiriki in Buddhism is the practice of meditation. In meditation, one observes the body (most often in the form of following the breath and mind to directly experience the principles of impermanence and dependent arising or "emptiness") of all phenomena. Such principles are formally discussed in the Buddhist scriptures, but jiriki implies experiencing them for oneself.

References

Further reading
 Bein, Steve. (2008, January). Self Power, Other Power, and Non-dualism in Japanese Buddhism. In Proceedings of the XXII World Congress of Philosophy (Vol. 6, pp. 7-13).
 Ford, James L. (2002). Jōkei and the Rhetoric of "Other-Power" and "Easy Practice" in Medieval Japanese Buddhism, Japanese Journal of Religious Studies 29 (1-2), 67-106
 Furuta, Shokin. (1990). jiriki (Self-power) and tariki (Other-power). Journal of Indian and Buddhist Studies (Indogaku Bukkyogaku Kenkyu), 39(1), 170-178.
 
 Ingram, Paul O. (1973). The Zen Critique of Pure Land Buddhism. Journal of the American Academy of Religion, 41(2), 184-200.
 Ingram, Paul O. (1968). Hōnen's and Shinran's Justification for Their Doctrine of Salvation by Faith through "Other Power", Contemporary Religions in Japan 9(3), 233-251

Buddhism in Japan
Faith in Buddhism